European Coalition (CE) was a Spanish electoral list in the European Parliament election in 2004 made up from various regionalist and moderate nationalist parties. The coalition failed to gain any representation in the European Parliament.

Composition

Electoral performance

European Parliament

References

Defunct political party alliances in Spain
Regionalist parties in Spain